Arianna Sanna (born 8 May 1998) is a Dominican Republic swimmer. She competed in the women's 200 metre freestyle event at the 2017 World Aquatics Championships.

References

1998 births
Living people
Dominican Republic female swimmers
Place of birth missing (living people)
Dominican Republic female freestyle swimmers